Sar Kang is a village in Nazil Rural District, Nukabad District, Khash County, Sistan and Baluchestan Province, Iran. At the 2006 census, its population was 509, in 115 families.

References 

Populated places in Khash County